Guillaume Cureau ( – 23 February 1648) was a French painter.

Life

Guillaume Cureau was born in La Rochefoucauld, Charente around 1595.
In 1620 in Angoulême, then in 1622 in Bordeaux, parish of Saint-Éloi, Cureau apprenticed with the painter Jos(eph) Roy.
On Roy's death he became a painter at the Hôtel de Ville of Bordeaux, one of whose duties was to paint portraits of jurats and mayors.
In 1625 he demanded payment for the portraits of Lacroix, Marot (or Maron), Vignoles, de Chimbaud, Dupin de Tortaty, Constant, Fouques and Bordenabe. 
From 1633 to 1635 he painted the vaults of the chapel of the Château de Cadillac.
Cureau died on 23 February 1648 in Bordeaux, France.

The portraits of jurats and mayors were given to their families after the death or the termination of the magistrate's function.
There remains in the possession of the Town Hall today, after the revolutionary auctions and the burning of the Town Hall, only one portrait: that of Mullet, Lord of La Tour.

Work

Only a few of Cureau's works are known today.
Messire de Mullet, oil on canvas, Bordeaux, Museum of Decorative Arts, deposit of the Museum of Fine Arts. Purchased by the municipality in 1856. 
In 1646 an altarpiece was commissioned by the Bordeaux town hall from the Bordeaux carpenter Raymond Caussade, it included the following two paintings.
 Saint Mommolin soothing a lunatic, Church of the Holy Cross, Bordeaux, oil on canvas, 1647 this painting, restored in 1988 was later slashed in the lower part.
 Saint Maur curing an invalid, Church of the Holy Cross, Bordeaux, oil on canvas,

Notes

Citations

Bibliography

 Available on Google Books under the title Nouvelles recherches sur la vie et les ouvrages d'Eustache Le Sueur.
 The painting of Saint Mommolin, unidentified, is described at length. 

1590s births
1648 deaths
17th-century French painters